Mohammad Hosseinpour (May 26, 1993 in Iran) is an Iranian football midfielder, who currently plays for Khoneh Be Khoneh in Azadegan League.

Club career

Club career statistics

 Assist Goals

International career

U23
He invited to Iran U-23 training camp by Nelo Vingada to preparation for Incheon 2014 and 2016 AFC U-22 Championship (Summer Olympic qualification).

References

External links
 Mohammad Hosseinpour at Persian League

1993 births
Iranian footballers
Living people
Esteghlal F.C. players
Rah Ahan players
Malavan players
Mes Rafsanjan players
Association football midfielders
People from Babol
Sportspeople from Mazandaran province